Alberta Provincial Highway No. 881, commonly referred to as Highway 881, is a highway split into two sections in northeast Alberta, Canada. A  section of Highway 55 joins the two sections. Lac La Biche County is lobbying the Government of Alberta to renumber the section of Highway 881 between Lac La Biche and Fort McMurray to Highway 36.

Both sections are entirely paved. This highway is also 49 Street in Hardisty, 53 Street in Irma, 47 Street in Mannville, 50 Street in Myrnam, and 40 Street in St. Paul.

Future 
In October 2012, the Government of Alberta announced $158 million in funding to improve Highway 881 between Lac La Biche and Fort McMurray, and an additional $150 million for extension of the highway from Anzac to Highway 69 (now Saprae Creek Trail) near Fort McMurray.

Major intersections 
Starting from the south end of Highway 881.

See also

 List of Alberta provincial highways

References

External links 

 Powerful wildfire memories spur council support for new highway 

881